This is a bibliography of works by the Canadian poet, essayist, translator, classicist, and professor Anne Carson.

Writings

Translations

Contributions

Books and broadsides

Journals and literary magazines

Anthologies and collections

Major sources
  [Doctoral thesis]

References

Bibliographies by writer
Bibliographies of Canadian writers